HLA-C belongs to the MHC (human = HLA) class I heavy chain receptors. The C receptor is a heterodimer consisting of a HLA-C mature gene product and β2-microglobulin. The mature C chain is anchored in the membrane. MHC Class I molecules, like HLA-C, are expressed in nearly all cells, and present small peptides to the immune system which surveys for non-self peptides.

HLA-C is a locus on chromosome 6, which encodes for many HLA-C alleles that are Class-I MHC receptors. HLA-C, localized proximal to the HLA-B locus, is located on the distal end of the HLA region. Most HLA-C:B haplotypes are in strong linkage disequilibrium and many are as ancient as the human species itself.

Disease associations

By serotype 

Cw1: multinodular goiters

By allele 

C*16: B-cell chronic lymphocytic leukemia

Nomenclature 

C*01 
Cw1 serotype: C*01:02 and C*01:09
Cw11
C*01:04 to *01:08

C*02
Cw2 serotype: C*02:02 and *02:08
C*02:03 to *02:07, and 02:09

C*03
Cw9 serotype: C*03:03
Cw10 serotype: C*03:02, *03:04, and *03:06
Cw3 serotype: C*03:07
C*03:05 and 03:08

C*04
Cw4 serotype: C*0401, *0407, and *0410

C*05
Cw5 serotype: C*05:01 and *05:02
C*05:03 to *05:06 and *05:08 to *05:10

C*06
Cw6 serotype: C*06:02 and *06:05
C*06:03, *06:04 and *06:06 to *06:11

C*07
Cw7 serotype: C*07:01 to *07:06, *07:12, *07:14, *07:16
C*07:07 to *07:11, *07:13, *07:15, and *07:17 to *07:29

C*08
Cw8 serotype: C*08:01, *08:02 and *08:03
C*08:05 to *08:12

Others
 C*12:02 to *12:15
 C*14:02 to *14:05
 C*15:01 to *15:11
 C*16:01 to *16:06
 C*17:01 to *17:03
 C*18:01 and *18:02

Common haplotype 

Cw4-B35 (Western Africa to Native Americans)  
Cw7-B7 (Western Eurasia, South Africa)
Cw7-B8 (Western Eurasia)
Cw1-B46 (China, Indochina)
Cw5-B44 (Western Eurasia)

Interactions 

HLA-C has been shown to interact with:
 KIR2DL1, 
 Leukocyte immunoglobulin-like receptor family: 
 particularly the activating receptor LILRA1
 LILRA3

References

Further reading

External links 
 Molecular Anthropology Yahoo Group
 HLA Allele and Haplotype Frequency Database

0